Murillo Velarde may refer to:

  (1696-1753), Spanish Catholic priest, Jesuit and cartographer; see Archaeology of the Philippines
 Velarde map or Murillo Velarde map, a historical map of the Philippines